Mikhail Meyreles Perez (born 26 October 1990) is a former international soccer player from the Dominican Republic who played as a forward. He is related to Consuelo Mutu, who was the wife of Romanian footballer Adrian Mutu. Adrian Mutu was the one who brought him to Fiorentina and to FC Snagov, the Romanian press nicknaming Perez as "Consuelo's nephew" and "Mutu's nephew".

International career
Mikhail Meyreles Perez played one international game for the Dominican Republic in July 2011 when coach Clemente Domingo Hernández sent him on the field in the 56th minute to replace Rafael Flores in a 2–0 away victory against Anguilla at the 2014 World Cup qualifiers.

References

External links
elnuevodiario.com.do

eldia.com.do

1990 births
Living people
Dominican Republic footballers
Dominican Republic international footballers
Association football forwards
ACF Gloria Bistrița players
Dominican Republic expatriate footballers
Expatriate footballers in Romania
Expatriate footballers in Italy